Neointima typically refers to scar tissue that forms within tubular anatomical structures such as blood vessels, as the intima is the innermost lining of these structures. Neointima can form as a result of vascular surgery such as angioplasty or stent placement. It is actually due to proliferation of smooth muscle cells in the media giving rise to appearance of fused intima and media

References

Medical terminology